Matthew Allen Grott (born December 5, 1967) is a former Major League Baseball pitcher who played for the Cincinnati Reds in .

Grott was born in Indiana but attended Apollo High School in Glendale, Arizona and Phoenix College. He went undrafted and signed in 1989 with the Oakland Athletics.

After his professional career, he coached baseball at Pinnacle High School in Phoenix.

References

External links

1967 births
Living people
Cincinnati Reds players
Major League Baseball pitchers
Baseball players from Indiana
Baseball players from Arizona
Arizona League Athletics players
Bowie Baysox players
Chattanooga Lookouts players
Harrisburg Senators players
Huntsville Stars players
Indianapolis Indians players
Madison Muskies players
Modesto A's players
Rochester Red Wings players
Scranton/Wilkes-Barre Red Barons players
Tucson Toros players
Phoenix Bears baseball players